The Palmetto Farm is a historic farmhouse in Palmetto, Tennessee, U.S.. It was built for Thomas Montgomery circa 1847, and it was designed in the Greek Revival architectural style. After Montgomery died in the American Civil War, the farm was inherited by his daughter Alice and her husband James Fount Tillman. Their son and his wife Sadie Wilson Tillman, a prominent Methodist, later inherited the house, which passed to Mrs. Roberta "Robert" Mason (a Montogmery descendant) and remained in the family until about 2010. It was listed on the National Register of Historic Places in 1985.

References

Houses on the National Register of Historic Places in Tennessee
Greek Revival houses in Tennessee
Houses completed in 1847
National Register of Historic Places in Marshall County, Tennessee